Košík is a municipality and village in Nymburk District in the Central Bohemian Region of the Czech Republic. It has about 400 inhabitants.

Administrative parts
Villages of Doubravany, Sovolusky and Tuchom are administrative parts of Košík.

Notable people
Václav Jírů (1910–1980), photographer and writer

References

Villages in Nymburk District